Dolicholatirus minusculus is a species of sea snail, a marine gastropod mollusc in the family Fasciolariidae, the spindle snails, the tulip snails and their allies.

Description
The length of the shell attains 23.1 mm.

Distribution
This marine species occurs off Madagascar.

References

Fasciolariidae
Gastropods described in 2007